Orlandi or the House of Orlandi were the prominent medieval Pisan family.

Orlandi also may refer to:

Other people  
Andrea Orlandi (born 1984), Spanish footballer
Carlo Orlandi (1910–1983), Italian boxer and Olympian
Carlo Orlandi (rugby player) (born 1967), Italian former rugby union player and coach
Deodato Orlandi (died before 1331), Italian painter of Medieval art
Elisa Orlandi (1811–1834), Italian opera singer
Emanuela Orlandi (born 1968), Vatican girl who disappeared in 1983
Emanuele Orlandi (born 1988), Italian footballer, currently playing for Carrarese
Eni Orlandi, Brazilian researcher 
Felice Orlandi (1925–2003), Italian-born American actor
Ferdinando Orlandi (1774–1848), Italian composer
Flavio Orlandi (1921–2009), Italian politician 
Giovanni Orlandi, Italian engraver and print publisher (16th-17th century)
Ivo Orlandi (1923–2000), Venezuelan Olympic sports shooter
José Orlandis (1918–2010), Spanish priest and historian
Juan Pablo Orlandi (born 1983), Argentinian rugby union footballer, currently playing for Racing Métro
Nazzareno Orlandi (1861–1952), Italian-Argentine painter
Nevio Orlandi (born 1954), Italian football manager
Pellegrino Antonio Orlandi (1660–1727), Italian writer and art historian
Rita Orlandi-Malaspina (born 1937), Italian opera singer
Stefano Orlandi (1681–1760), Italian painter
Ugo Orlandi (born 1958), Italian musicologist, university professor and mandolinist
Vittorio Orlandi (born 1938), Italian show jumping rider

Italian-language surnames